The 1966 United States Road Racing Championship season was the fourth season of the Sports Car Club of America's United States Road Racing Championship. It began April 24, 1966, and ended September 4, 1966, after eight races.  GT cars were dropped from the program; only the two sports car classes were run.  Chuck Parsons won the season championship.

Schedule

Season results
Overall winner in bold.

External links
World Sports Racing Prototypes: USRRC 1966
Racing Sports Cars: USRRC archive

United States Road Racing Championship
United States Road Racing Championship